Bateidae is a family of amphipod crustaceans, comprising the single genus Batea, which in turn contains thirteen species:
Batea bousfieldi (Ortiz, 1991)
Batea campi (Ortiz, 1991)
Batea carinata (Shoemaker, 1926)
Batea catharinensis Müller, 1865
Batea conductor (J. L. Barnard, 1969)
Batea coyoa (J. L. Barnard, 1969)
Batea cuspidata (Shoemaker, 1926)
Batea intermedia Serejo, 2007
Batea lobata Shoemaker, 1926
Batea rectangulata Shoemaker, 1925
Batea schotti Ortiz & Lemaitre, 1997
Batea susurrator J. L. Barnard, 1969
Batea transversa Shoemaker, 1926

References

Gammaridea
Monogeneric crustacean families
Taxa named by Thomas Roscoe Rede Stebbing